Carlo Emanuele dal Pozzo, 5th Prince of La Cisterna (7 January 1787 in Turin – 26 March 1864 in Turin) was a nobleman and politician in the Kingdom of Sardinia. His other titles were 5th Principe di Belriguardo, 6th Marchese di Voghera, 6th Conte di Reano, 8th Conte di Ponderano, 8th Conte di Bonvicino, 6th Conte di Neive, 6th Conte di Perno, among others.

Life and marriage
The prince was a liberal, and he conspired in his youth against King Victor Emmanuel I of Sardinia in favour of a constitutional monarchy. This attempt failed, and he was forced into exile in France, where he continued promoting the Risorgimento. In 1848, he was allowed to return to Italy, and he became a senator of Sardinia.

In Brussels on 28 September 1846, he married Countess Louise de Merode-Westerloo, daughter of Count Werner de Merode (of the princely house of Rubempré) by his wife, Countess Victoire de Spangen d'Uyternesse. The couple had two daughters.

He was made a baron of the French Empire in 1810 and became chamberlain in the same year to Camillo Borghese, Duke of Guastalla.

Issue
Princess Maria Vittoria dal Pozzo (1847–1876), married Prince Amedeo of Savoy, Duke of Aosta (second son of King Victor Emmanuel II of Italy), who briefly occupied the Spanish throne from 1870 to 1873. After the death of Carlo Emanuele, Maria Vittoria inherited her father's titles, which passed through her to the Aosta cadet branch of the House of Savoy.
Princess Beatrice Giuseppa Antonia Luisa dal Pozzo (1851–1864), died during childhood. Buried at Chapel of Madonna of Pietà, Reano.

Ancestry

References

External links
 Dal Pózzo della Cistèrna, Emanuele, principe  on treccani.it (Italian)
 Dal Pozzo (di Biella) Principi di Cisterna e Belriguardo

1787 births
1864 deaths
House of Pozzo
Italian nobility
Carlo Emmanuele
Members of the Senate of the Kingdom of Italy